UX Orionis is a variable star in the constellation of Orion. It is a Herbig Ae star, located about 1000 light years from the Earth. At its brightest it is a magnitude 9.5 object, so it is too faint to be seen with the naked eye. UX Orionis is the prototype of the UX Orionis class of variable stars (often called "UXors"), which are young stellar objects that exhibit large (greater than 2.8 magnitude), irregular changes in visual band brightness.  UX Orionis was discovered by Henrietta Swan Leavitt.

UX Orionis is surrounded by a circumstellar disk, and the star's photometric variability appears to be caused by episodes during which the star is obscured by dusty material within the circumstellar disk.

References

Orion (constellation)
Herbig Ae/Be stars
293782
23602
J05042998-0347142
Orionis, UX